Laojun Mountain is a mountain in the northwest part of Yunnan Province, China. The region includes four counties: Yulong, Jianchuan, Lanping, and Weixi. The western part of the region adjoins the Lancang River, while the eastern part is contiguous with the Jinsha River. The region was included in the Three Parallel Rivers UNESCO World Heritage Site in 2003, and the Laojun Mountain National Park was announced in January 2009.

Conservation
Laojun Mountain region is a biodiversity hotspot. Laojun Mountain has over 170 species of macrofungi (mushrooms), about 10% of all rhododendrons in the world, and it is one of the few remaining places where the endangered Yunnan snub-nosed monkey (Rhinopithecus bieti) can be found.In 2015, TNC established a conservancy program on the mountain, in Liju village, concerning the animal. It offers business opportunities and training to local residents, to provide alternatives to poaching and logging, in order to protect the monkeys.

See also
List of mountains in China

References

Mountains of Yunnan
Geography of Lijiang